The Man They Could Not Hang is a non-fiction book about the life story of John 'Babbacombe' Lee, the butler who was convicted of the murder of Emma Keyse, his elderly employer in 1907. The title refers to the legendary fact that the attempts to execute John Lee by hanging had failed three times.

1908 book
The 1908 book is by John Lee but with embellished autobiographical details.

2005 book
The 2005 book was researched and written by Mike Holgate and Ian David Waugh, who managed to update some of the mysteries surrounding the 1884 murder, most notably John Lee's apparent disappearance after his release.

References

1908 non-fiction books
2005 non-fiction books
Non-fiction books about murders in the United States
John Babbacombe Lee